Acme Novelty Library is a comic book series created by Chicago cartoonist Chris Ware. Its first issue appeared in 1993. Published from 1994 by Fantagraphics Books and later self-published, it is considered a significant work in alternative comics, selling over 20,000 copies per issue.

Format, style and content
Acme Novelty Library has adopted numerous formats in the course of the series and, similarly, doesn't feature a continuous cast of characters. It has showcased early Ware comics, such as Quimby the Mouse from The Daily Texan, and more recent strips from NewCity, a Chicago weekly paper.

Ware's first major graphic novel, Jimmy Corrigan, the Smartest Kid on Earth, was originally serialized in Acme Novelty Library between 1995 and 2000. Jimmy Corrigan is the saga of a lonely childlike man and his alienated ancestors, partly inspired by Ware's hopeful but unhappy reunion with his absentee father. The collected edition was released to much acclaim, winning the Guardian First Book Award, amongst others.

Rusty Brown and Building Stories began serialization in issue 16. With this issue, Ware also began to self-publish the title, with Fantagraphics and later Drawn & Quarterly acting as distributor. When asked why he chose to self-publish Ware stated:

Well, it's for a complicated variety of reasons, but mostly it was because I realized a year or two ago that I simply wasn’t really inspired to do it any more, and when I imagined taking over every aspect of it myself, I was suddenly inspired, almost anxious, to work on it again. In short, it just feels a little more like "art" to me now, since I’m responsible for everything that goes into it, and there’s no one to blame but myself if it's awful...

Issues are imbued with the defining characteristics of Ware's work; a pervasive sadness and nihilism permeate tales of disappointment, thwarted affection, and the dehumanization of the individual in a modern and mechanized world. Through the use of apparently extraneous novelties, such as cut-outs and flip-books, and prose parodies set in tiny fonts, Ware blurs the boundaries between author/reader/character. These interventions offer complex and simultaneous multilinear readings of the page that serve to thematise Ware's engagement with issues of narrative and continuity.

Acme Novelty Library series
Issues 1–15 were published by Fantagraphics Books. Ware started self-publishing the series starting with #16, which was distributed by Fantagraphics, with subsequent issues distributed by Drawn & Quarterly.

Issue 18 was published in 2007 containing Ware's "Thanksgiving" covers for the November 26, 2006, issue of The New Yorker, plus supplementary material, in portfolio format.

The title has been collected into volumes published by Pantheon Books (US), Fantagraphics Books (US) and Jonathan Cape (UK):
 Jimmy Corrigan, the Smartest Kid on Earth (2000), Pantheon / Cape (collects issue 5, 6, 8, 9 and 11–14).
 Quimby the Mouse (2003), Fantagraphics / Cape (collects issues 2 and 4 with additional material).
 The Acme Novelty Library Final Report to Shareholders and Rainy Day Saturday Afternoon Fun Book (2005), Pantheon / Cape (collects issues 7 and 15 with additional material, including parody ads and the ACME company "tour").
 Building Stories (2012), Pantheon Books Pantheon / Cape (collects issue 18 with material from issue 16, other periodicals, and new material).
 Rusty Brown (2019), Pantheon Books (collects material from issues 16, 17, 19, 20, as well as new material).

Numbers 1, 3, and 10 are the only issues to remain uncollected at this time.

Awards
The series has been widely recognized in the industry.

The series won the Eisner Award for Best Continuing Series of 1996 and 2000; Best New Graphic Album of 2000; and Best Publication Design of 1995, 1996, 1997, and 2002. Furthermore, an Acme Novelty Library display stand won the Eisner Award for Best Comics-Related Product of 1998. Ware won the Eisner Award for his work in Acme Novelty Library for Best Artist/Writer-Drama of 2008; Best Artist/Writer of 2009; Best Colorist of 1996, 1998, 2001 and 2006; and Best Letterer of 2009.

The series won the Harvey Award for Best New Series of 1995; Best Continuing or Limited Series of 2000 and 2001; Best Single Issue or Story of 1997 and 2000; and Harvey Special Award for Excellence in Presentation every year from 1995 to 2000. Ware won the Harvey Award for his work in Acme Novelty Library for Best Cartoonist of 2006; Best Letterer of 1996, 2000, 2002, and 2006; Best Cover Artist of 2000; and Best Colorist of 1996, 1997, 1998, 2000 and 2002.

The series won Ignatz Awards for Outstanding Series of 1997, 1998; Outstanding Comic of 1998 and 2000; Outstanding Story of 2000 (Jimmy Corrigan); and Outstanding Graphic Novel of 2009.

Other awards won by Acme Novelty Library include 1999 National Cartoonists Society's Award for Best Comic Book and Good Taste Awards for Best New Series of 1994; Best Continuing Series of 1995, 1996, 1997, 1999, and 2000; Best Single Issue of 1996, 1999, and 2000; Best Ongoing Serialized Story of 1999 (Jimmy Corrigan); and Best Production Design of 1998, 1999, and 2000.

References

External links

Comics by Chris Ware
Fantagraphics titles
1993 comics debuts
Eisner Award winners for Best Continuing Series
Eisner Award winners for Best Graphic Album: New
Harvey Award winners for Best New Series
Harvey Award winners for Best Continuing or Limited Series
Harvey Award winners for Best Single Issue or Story
Ignatz Award winners for Outstanding Series
Ignatz Award winners for Outstanding Graphic Novel or Collection
Ignatz Award winners for Outstanding Story
Metafictional comics